= Parque Paseo del Teleférico =

Park in Puebla, Mexico

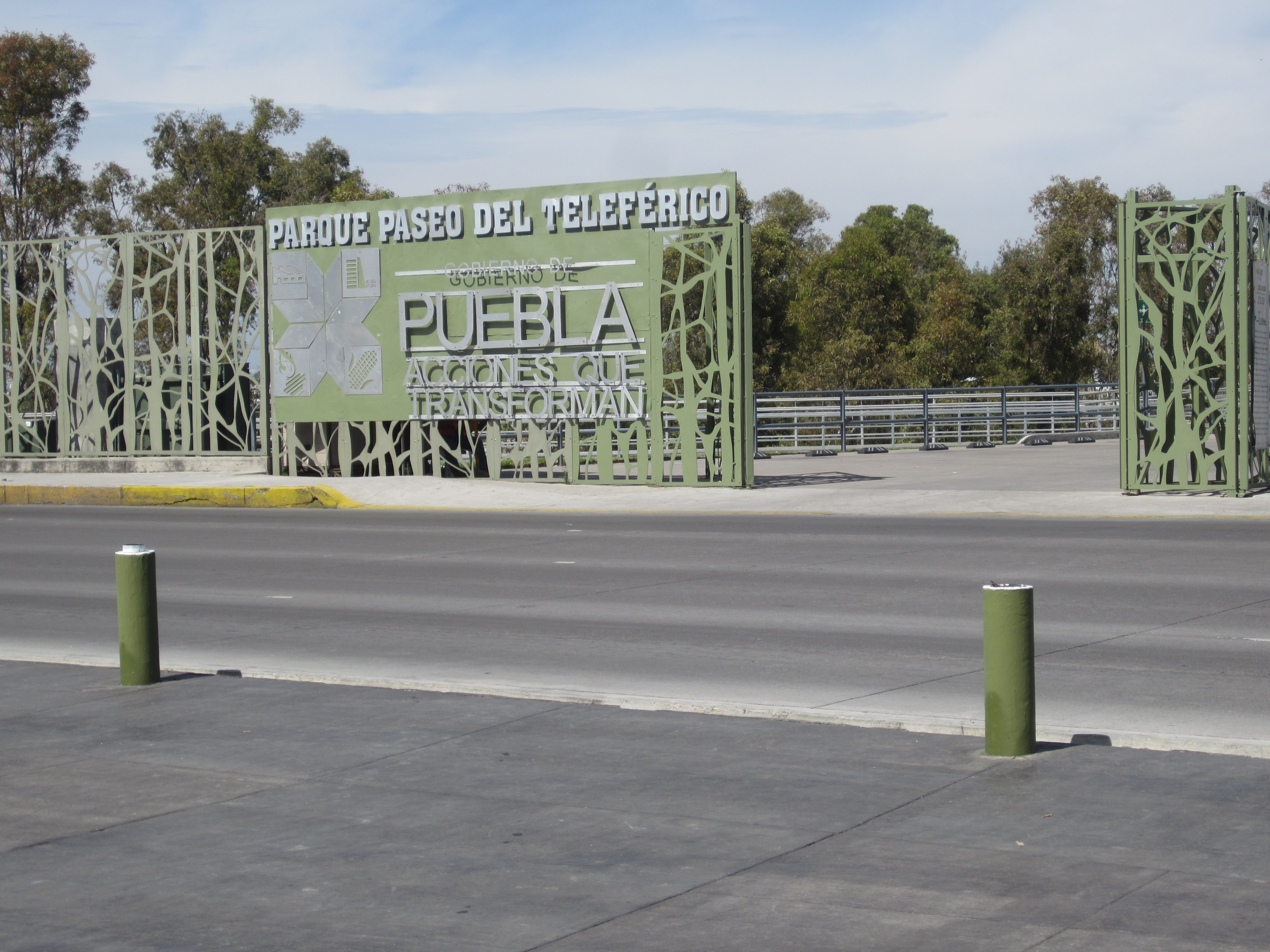
- Park signage in 2018

- Location within Mexico
- Type: Park
- Location: Puebla, Mexico
- Coordinates: 19°3′42″N 98°11′2″W

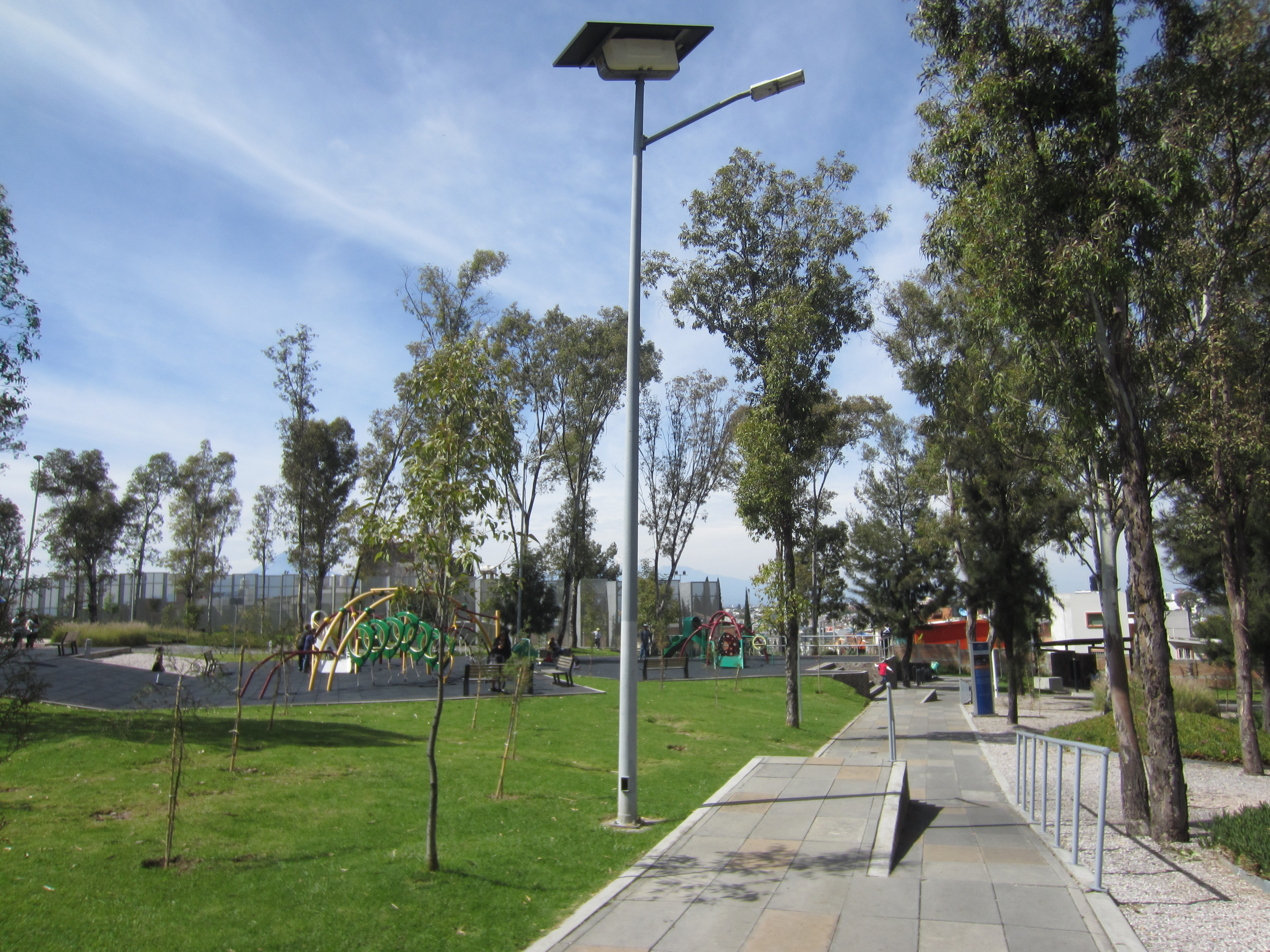
Part of the park, 2018

Parque Paseo del Teleférico is a park in the city of Puebla, in the Mexican state of Puebla.
